Dołgie may refer to the following places:
Dołgie, Drawsko County in West Pomeranian Voivodeship (north-west Poland)
Dołgie, Gryfino County in West Pomeranian Voivodeship (north-west Poland)
Dołgie, Szczecinek County in West Pomeranian Voivodeship (north-west Poland)